Vitreledonella alberti is an incirrate octopus, in the genus Vitreledonella of the family Amphitretidae. It was named alberti in honor of Albert I, Prince of Monaco.

Description 
It is a transparent octopus. It was discovered by Louis Joubin in 1924, six years after the discovery of its better-known congener Vitreledonella richardi.

References

Octopuses
Molluscs described in 1924